Lycée Henri Wallon may refer to:
Lycée Henri Wallon in Aubervilliers
 in Valenciennes